Brasityphis barrosi is a species of sea snail, a marine gastropod mollusk in the family Muricidae, the murex snails or rock snails.

Description

Distribution
This marine species occurs off Northeastern Brazil.

References

 Absalao, R.S. & Dos Santos, F., 2003. A new genus and species of Typhinae (Mollusca, Gastropoda, Muricidae) from off northeastern Brazil. Zootaxa 279: 1-6

Brasityphis
Gastropods described in 2003